John Wishart  (28 November 1898 – 14 July 1956) was a Scottish mathematician and agricultural statistician.

He gave his name to the Wishart distribution in statistics.

Life 
Wishart was born in Perth, Scotland on 28 November 1898, the son of Elizabeth and John Wishart of Montrose. His father was a bootmaker. The family moved from Montrose to Perth around 1903, living at 36 Robertsons Buildings on Barrack Street. He was educated at Perth Academy.

In the First World War he was conscripted into the Black Watch in 1917 and served two years in France.

He studied Mathematics at Edinburgh University under Edmund Taylor Whittaker, graduating MA BSc before winning a place at Cambridge University where he gained a further MA. He then gained a doctorate (DSc) at the University College London under Karl Pearson. After a year of teacher training at Moray College of Education in Edinburgh he then worked for some years as a Mathematics Teacher at West Leeds High School.

In 1927 he joined Rothamsted Experimental Station with Ronald Fisher, and then (from 1931) as a Reader in Statistics in the University of Cambridge where he became the first Director of the Statistical Laboratory in 1953. He was elected a Fellow of the Royal Society of Edinburgh in 1931, his proposers being Edmund Taylor Whittaker, Malcolm Laurie, Alexander Craig Aitken and Robert Schlapp.

He edited Biometrika from 1937. In 1950 he was elected as a Fellow of the American Statistical Association. He first formulated a generalised product-moment distribution named the Wishart distribution in his honour, in 1928.

In the Second World War he first served as a Captain in the Intelligence Corps then in 1942 became assistant secretary at the Admiralty.

Wishart drowned aged 57 in July 1956, having suffered a stroke while swimming in the sea at Revolcadero Beach, Acapulco. He was in Acapulco as a representative of the Food and Agriculture Organization, and on a mission to set up a research centre.

Publications

Biometrika

Family

In 1924 he married Olive Birdsall. They had two sons.

Notes

References

 
Times Obituary

First World War service

1898 births
1956 deaths
Writers from Perth, Scotland
People educated at Perth Academy
Alumni of the University of Edinburgh
Alumni of University College London
Fellows of the American Statistical Association
Fellows of the Royal Society of Edinburgh
Intelligence Corps officers
Rothamsted statisticians
Scottish agronomists
Scottish schoolteachers
Scottish statisticians
Accidental deaths in Mexico
Deaths by drowning
20th-century Scottish mathematicians
20th-century Scottish educators
Cambridge mathematicians
20th-century agronomists
Mathematical statisticians